Kohat District is a district in Kohat Division of Khyber Pakhtunkhwa province in Pakistan. Kohat city is the capital of the district.

History

Mughal era
From the early sixteenth century the history of Kohat revolves around three major tribes namely Bangash, Banoori, and Afridi. These people appear to have settled in the district, during 14th and 15th centuries. From 16th to 18th centuries, Kohat being part of Mughal Empire was administered by the chiefs of two aforementioned tribes.

Demography 
At the time of the 2017 census the district had a population of 1,111,266, of which 555,765 were males and 555,390 females. Rural population was 841,340 (75.71%) while the urban population was 269,926 (24.29%). The literacy rate was 58.59% - the male literacy rate was 77.75% while the female literacy rate was 39.96%.

At the time of the 2011 census, 83.85% of the population spoke Pashto, 12.87% Hindko, 1.24% Urdu and 1.19% Punjabi as their first language.

Religion

Administration
Kohat district is divided into four Tehsils:
 Kohat
 Lachi
 Gumbat
 Dara Adam Khel Tehsil (formerly Frontier Region Kohat)

Provincial Assembly

References

Bibliography

 
Districts of Khyber Pakhtunkhwa